The canton of Villemur-sur-Tarn is an administrative division of the Haute-Garonne department, southern France. Its borders were modified at the French canton reorganisation which came into effect in March 2015. Its seat is in Villemur-sur-Tarn.

It consists of the following communes:
 
Bessières
Bondigoux
Le Born
Bouloc
Buzet-sur-Tarn
Castelnau-d'Estrétefonds
Cépet
Fronton
Gargas
Layrac-sur-Tarn
La Magdelaine-sur-Tarn
Mirepoix-sur-Tarn
Saint-Rustice
Saint-Sauveur
Vacquiers
Villaudric
Villematier
Villemur-sur-Tarn
Villeneuve-lès-Bouloc

References

Cantons of Haute-Garonne